The barony of Hussey has been created three times in the Peerage of England. Of these, one creation is abeyant while the other two are extinct or forfeited respectively.

The first creation was in 1295, for Henry Hussey. This creation became abeyant in 1470 on the death of the 7th baron. The second creation was in 1348, for John Hussey, but he had no legal heirs and the title became extinct on his death in 1361. The third creation was in 1529 for a different John Hussey, but he was attainted in 1537 and the peerage was forfeited.

Barons Hussey, first creation (1295) 
Henry Hussey, 1st Baron Hussey (1265–1332)
Henry Hussey, 2nd Baron Hussey (1302–1349)
Henry Hussey, 3rd Baron Hussey (d. 1349)
Henry Hussey, 4th Baron Hussey (d. 1384)
Henry Hussey, 5th Baron Hussey (1362–1409)
Henry Hussey, 6th Baron Hussey (d. 1460)
Nicholas Hussey, 7th Baron Hussey (d. 1470) (abeyant)

Barons Hussey, second creation (1348) 
John Hussey, 1st Baron Hussey (d. 1361) (extinct)

Barons Hussey of Sleaford, third creation (1529) 
John Hussey, 1st Baron Hussey of Sleaford (1465/1466–1537) (forfeit)

See also
Marmaduke Hussey, Baron Hussey of North Bradley
Susan Hussey, Baroness Hussey of North Bradley

References

1295 establishments in England
Extinct baronies in the Peerage of England
Abeyant baronies in the Peerage of England
Forfeited baronies in the Peerage of England
Noble titles created in 1295
Noble titles created in 1348
Noble titles created in 1529